Jacky Leung Nok Hang (born 14 November 1994 in Hong Kong) is a Hong Kong professional footballer who currently plays as a centre-back for Chinese Super League club Zhejiang Pro. He is the younger brother of current Eastern and Hong Kong international player Leung Kwun Chung.

Club career

In 2010, Leung Nok Hang won a Dreams Come True scholarship which allowed him to complete his high school studies in Britain at the Brooke House College Football Academy with all costs covered. Leung Nok Hang would return back to Hong Kong and joined YFCMD in 2013. He would go on to make his professional debut on 1 September 2013, in a league game against Citizen in a 1-1 draw. 

Leung Nok Hang joined Pegasus in 2015 and would go on to establish himself as a vital member of the team that won the 2015–16 Hong Kong FA Cup and 2015–16 Hong Kong Sapling Cup. With these achievements he would join the most historically successful football club in Hong Kong, South China in 2016. Once again Leung Nok Hang immediately established himself as a vital member of the team, but the club finished in a disappointing fourth and the owners decided to reduce funding of the club, which saw on 5 June 2017, South China made the shocking announcement that they would voluntarily self-relegate into the First Division.

On 11 June 2017, Pegasus chairperson Canny Leung revealed that Leung along with three other South China players would be jumping ship to Pegasus. After one season he would go out on trial training before officially signing with R&F on 13 August 2018.

On 1 May 2020, R&F agreed to a swap Leung for Meizhou Hakka's Tsui Wang Kit. Making his debut in a league game on 13 September 2020 against Liaoning Shenyang Urban in 2-0 victory. He would go on to establish himself as a vital member of the team that finished at the time a club record high of fifth within the second tier.    

On 7 January 2021, Leung was sold to Zhejiang Greentown for a fee of up to RMB $20 million (US$3 million), which is a record for a Hong Kong player. In his first season he quickly established himself as a vital member of the team as the club gained promotion to the top tier at the end of the 2021 campaign.

International career
On 16 October 2018, Leung made his debut for Hong Kong, coming on as an 82nd-minute substitute in a friendly against Indonesia.

Career statistics

Club
.

International

Honours

Club
Pegasus
 Hong Kong FA Cup: 2015–16
 Hong Kong Sapling Cup: 2015–16

References

External links
 
 

1994 births
Living people
Hong Kong footballers
Hong Kong international footballers
Hong Kong people
Hong Kong Premier League players
Association football defenders
TSW Pegasus FC players
South China AA players
Metro Gallery FC players
Lee Man FC players
R&F (Hong Kong) players
Meizhou Hakka F.C. players
Zhejiang Professional F.C. players
China League One players
Chinese Super League players
Hong Kong expatriate footballers
Hong Kong expatriate sportspeople in China
Expatriate footballers in China
Footballers at the 2014 Asian Games
Asian Games competitors for Hong Kong
Hong Kong League XI representative players